Göppingen is a Landkreis (district) in the middle of Baden-Württemberg, Germany. Neighboring districts are Rems-Murr, Ostalbkreis, Heidenheim, Alb-Donau, Reutlingen and Esslingen.

History
In 1817, Württemberg was divided into four kreise (districts), the southeastern one of which was named Donaukreis.  The four kreise were in turn divided into oberämter.  In Donaukreis, the most northern of the oberämter were Göppingen and to its east Geislingen.  In 1938, the four kreise were abolished, and being was merged with Göppingen.  During the communal reform of 1973 the district was not changed much, with only a few municipalities from the districts Schwäbisch Gmünd and Ulm were added.

The district is sometimes called Stauferkreis because the Staufen family had their roots in the area. However, when the family had no more heirs, it became part of Württemberg in the 14th century.

Partnerships
In 1990 a partnership with the district Löbau (now merged into the district of Görlitz) in Saxony was started, to help to build the administration according to western German standards. The municipality Boll already had a partnership with Herrnhut in Löbau before.  After the districts started their partnership, several other municipalities of the two districts started partnership as well.

Geography
The district is located in the northern foothills of the Swabian Jura (Schwäbische Alb). It is crossed by the Fils, a tributary of the Neckar.

Coat of arms
The lion is the symbol of the Staufen family, which had its roots in the district. The deer antler above is the symbol of Württemberg and symbolizes the change of ownership after the Staufer family died out.

Cities and municipalities

References

External links

Official website (German)

 
Stuttgart (region)
Districts of Baden-Württemberg